Capri Cinema could refer to:

Capri Theatre, in the suburb of Goodwood in Adelaide, South Australia (formerly Cinema Capri)
Capri Cinema (Chicago), in Chicago, now defunct.